The discography of American pop group The Walker Brothers consists of eight studio albums, two of which were created for the American market, one live album, three extended plays, twenty singles, twenty b-sides and numerous compilations - several of which are listed here.

Studio albums

Live albums
 Walker Brothers in Japan (1968, Philips (Japan)) (re-issued 1987, Bam Caruso (UK))

Compilation albums
This is a list of Walker Brothers compilations that were released in the UK.
 The Fabulous Walker Brothers (1966, Philips)
 The Walker Brothers' Story (2xLP) (1968, Philips) – UK #9
 The Immortal Walker Brothers (1968, Philips)
 Make It Easy On Yourself (1972, Philips)
 Greatest Hits (2xLP) (1975, Philips)
 Spotlight On (2xLP) (1977, Philips)
 Hits (1982, Philips)
 Gala (1986, Philips)
 After the Lights Go Out: The Best of 1965–1967 (1990, Fontana/Phonogram)
 No Regrets – The Best of Scott Walker and The Walker Brothers 1965–1976 (1992, Polygram) – UK #4, BPI: Gold
 Scott Walker and The Walker Brothers – A Very Special Collection (1993, Pickwick)
 The Collection (1996, Spectrum/Universal) – BPI: Silver
 If You Could Hear Me Now (2001, Columbia)
 Superhits (2005, Epic)
 The Sun Ain't Gonna Shine Anymore – The Best of Scott Walker and The Walker Brothers (2006, Universal Music TV) – UK #24
 Everything Under the Sun – The Complete Studio Recordings (5xCD box set) (2006, Universal International)
 The Silver Collection (2007, Spectrum/Universal)
 My Ship Is Coming In - The Collection (2009, Spectrum/Universal) (2xCD)
 3 Original Album Classics (3xCD box set) (2010, Legacy/Columbia)

Extended plays

Singles
All non-UK singles list the country of release in brackets. B-sides vary in some territories.

References

Discographies of American artists
Rock music group discographies
Pop music group discographies